is a town located in Hidaka Subprefecture, Hokkaido, Japan.

History
The town was established September 1881.

Geography
Niikappu stretches from the Pacific Ocean of southeast Hokkaido north to the Hidaka Mountains along the Niikappu River. The town covers a total area of 585.88 km2. Its highest point is Mount Poroshiri, and the lowest is at the coast. The town runs  East-West and  North-South

Economy

The town is mainly known for production of racehorses, including Haiseiko, Narita Brian, and Oguri Cap. Other popular exports include kelp, green capsicum, and milk.

Art and Culture
Niikappu has a large collection of records, preserved in Japan's largest vinyl record museum.
In the Taiyo district of Niikappu lies the Forest of the Sun Dimaccio Museum, a converted elementary school dedicated to housing the works of French artist Gerard Dimaccio.

Other features of Niikappu include:
 A mud volcano deikazan (Supposedly the only one in Japan.)
 Hangandate Forest Park, a seaside park with a playground and an ocean view
 A Youth Hostel
 Shonen Shizen no Ie boys' nature house
 A campground

Mascot

She is a superhero horse who wears earrings made of azalea and green bell peppers and a cape. Her weapon is an asparagus. Her heart-shape nose is a sign of peace. She watches over Niikappu everyday.

Transportation

Rail
Niikappu was served by the JR Hokkaido Hidaka Main Line. Plans to restore this section of the line have been abandoned, due to declining passenger numbers and very high maintenance costs, and the section will be officially closed on 1 April 2021 to be replaced by a bus service.

Stations in Niikappu:  -  -

Road

References

External links

Official Website 

Towns in Hokkaido